John Hultberg (February 8, 1922 – April 15, 2005) was an American Abstract expressionist and Abstract realist painter. Early in his career he was related to the Bay Area Figurative Movement; he was also a lecturer and playwright.

Early life and education
John Hultberg was born in 1922 in Berkeley, California. He had a sister, Helen, and brothers Paul and Dean.

Hultberg attended Fresno State College, graduating in 1943. During World War II, he was a Navy lieutenant. After the war, his education at the California School of Fine Arts (CSFA) (now the San Francisco Art Institute) was funded by the G.I. Bill. His teachers included Mark Rothko and Clyfford Still and he was a classmate of Richard Diebenkorn, who was also a mentor, James Budd Dixon, Walter Kuhlman, Frank Lobdell, and George Stillman, which whom he created a portfolio of 17 lithographs. This 1948 portfolio, titled Drawings, has been acknowledged as a landmark in Abstract Expressionist printmaking. The group has been referred to as "The Sausalito Six," because most, lived in Sausalito, north of San Francisco. He was also a contemporary of Clay Spohn and David Park. Hultberg studied at the Art Students League of New York beginning in 1952

Personal life
Hultberg was first married to Hilary Blech. In 1961 Hultberg met fellow artist Lynne Mapp Drexler at The Artist's Club in New York. Artists there discussed abstract expressionism. Drexler and Hultberg were married and three years traveled and lived in Mexico, the West Coast and Hawaii. Then, they lived at New York's Chelsea Hotel in the late 1960s.

Seeking a relaxing environment, the couple bought a house off the coast of Maine on Monhegan Island in 1971 and split their time between New York City and Maine, particularly spending the summers at their island house.

By 1983, Drexler moved year-around and permanently near Lighthouse Hill on Monhegan Island, an artists' haven off the coast of Maine, where she had spent most summers since 1963. Hultberg did not like to live year-round, particularly during the harsh winters, at Monhegan Island and moved to Portland in 1985. He asked Drexler to come with him, but she decided to stay on the island. They were estranged at that time of her death, on December 30, 1999.

He died of complications of a stroke on April 15, 2005, at Roosevelt Hospital in New York. He lived on the Upper West Side of the city. He had a son named Carl R. Hultberg and Elaine Wechsler was his agent and partner.

Career

Hultberg primarily made Abstract expressionist paintings that were minimalist and dark, and also made Surrealist invented landscapes with "linear perspectives and angular shapes." Hultberg was described as an Abstract realism, who combines "abstract" and "concrete" with attention to detail, bold color use, and strong design.

In 1952 he was introduced at the Museum of Modern Art in a show of new artists. He lived for one year in Paris between 1954 and 1955 and gained a reputation there for his work. In 1955 he won the Corcoran Biennial first prize in Washington.  In the mid to late 1950s, Hultberg, along with his colleague and friend Norman Carton, worked at and regularly exhibited at the Martha Jackson Gallery.

His paintings were influenced by his time spent at Monhegan Island, and his career thrived after he moved to Portland. His work was shown in many galleries, including the Anita Shapolsky Gallery in New York City and the Albright Art Gallery in Buffalo, New York, he gave lectures, and in 1985 he had an exhibition at the Portland Museum of Art.

A play that he wrote was produced the University of Maine theatre department. He published the book Sole Witness, Vagabondage, a Paris Odyssey (1953–1955), his poetry and other books. He taught art in Hawaii and the West Coast.

He was teaching at the Art Students League and was a full-time resident in New York by 1990. He taught until the week of his death at the Art Students League. His work was part of a group show at Aucocisco in Portland in February 2005, at which time he was living in New York City.

Legacy

Collections
His works are in the following collections:
 Guggenheim Museum, New York
 Metropolitan Museum of Art
 Museum of Modern Art, New York City, which has 20 of his works, all but one made in 1963.
 Portland Museum of Art, Maine
 Southern Alleghenies Museum of Art
 Whitney Museum of American Art

Notes

References

1922 births
2005 deaths
Painters from New York (state)
United States Navy personnel of World War II
California State University, Fresno alumni
Artists from Berkeley, California
San Francisco Art Institute alumni
Painters from California
20th-century American painters
American male painters
United States Navy officers
Military personnel from California
20th-century American male artists